Rajeev Ram and Bobby Reynolds were the defending champions, but Reynolds decided to not compete due to injury.
As a result, Ram partnered with David Martin, however they were eliminated by brothers Battistone in the quarterfinals.
Brian and Dann Battistone won in the final match 7–5, 7–6(5), against Treat Conrad Huey and Harsh Mankad.

Seeds

Draw

Draw

References
 Doubles Draw
 Qualifying Doubles Draw

JSM Challenger of Champaign-Urbana - Doubles
JSM Challenger of Champaign–Urbana